Kuybyshevsky District is an administrative and municipal district (raion), one of the forty-three in Rostov Oblast, Russia. It is located in the west of the oblast. Its administrative center is the rural locality (a selo) of Kuybyshevo. Population: 14,800 (2010 Census);  The population of Kuybyshevo accounts for 41.5% of the district's total population.

Notable residents 

Andrei Grechko (1903–1976), Soviet Minister of Defence 1967–1976

References

Notes

Sources

Districts of Rostov Oblast